Trash It is an puzzle platform game developed by Rage Software and published by GT Interactive in July 1997. It was released in PAL-territories only for MS-DOS, PlayStation and the Sega Saturn.

Gameplay 
Players play as construction worker Jack Hammer who is aiming to defeat Doctor Moonbeam in his bid to "turn the world into a sugar lump to put in his cup of tea". Players use Jack's large hammer to destroy the buildings of Timmy World under a time limit, gaining Timmy Points by hoovering up the Timmies released from destroyed structures to purchase weapon upgrades in the Hammer Shop. The game includes Quest, Battle and Arcade modes, the latter of which supports up to four players.

Reception 

The game received a poor critical reception. Iain White of Saturn Power magazine gave a score of 51%, describing the title as "slow-moving, badly designed and utterly utterly tedious" and decrying its "blocky looking graphics". Sega Saturn Magazine's Gary Cutlack was even more damning, offering a score of 38%, noting that while "the idea of destroying stuff with a hammer sounds cool...the gameplay is dull beyond belief", and criticising the "very rough, very brown, very dull" graphics and "samey and uninspired levels".

Reviewing the PlayStation release Play's Tom Sargent labelled Trash It as an "unusual puzzle-come-platform game" that "plays too sluggishly and becomes repetitive far too soon...a 16-bit game at a 32-bit price".

References 

1997 video games
DOS games
PlayStation (console) games
Sega Saturn games
Video games developed in the United Kingdom
Rage Games games
Multiplayer and single-player video games
Puzzle video games
Platform games
GT Interactive games